University School of Jackson (USJ) is a non-denominational, non-sectarian, independent, college preparatory school located in northwest Jackson, Tennessee, that educates students from infancy through the 12th grade.

History
Old Hickory Academy and Episcopal Day School began as two separate schools in 1970. Old Hickory Academy was an independent school which included primary education through a high school curriculum. Episcopal Day School was a smaller, parochial school which emphasized primary education, but had begun a high school program by 1986, enrolling grades nine and ten.

In 1987 the two schools consolidated, forming University School of Jackson.

Academics

In 2018, USJ opened an academic center to provide educational support for students with learning prescriptions.

Administration
Current head of the school is Don Roe, who previously was the Associate Head of School, and director of Middle School. He replaces Stuart Hirstein.

References

1970 establishments in Tennessee
Jackson, Tennessee
Preparatory schools in Tennessee
Private K-12 schools in Tennessee
Schools in Madison County, Tennessee